Tracy station is a commuter rail station in southern Tracy, California served by the Altamont Corridor Express. It is on the Union Pacific Railroad Oakland Subdivision, formerly the Western Pacific Railroad.

References

External links 

 ACE Tracy Station
 ACE Tracy Station (Amtrak)

Altamont Corridor Express stations in San Joaquin County, California
Tracy, California
Railway stations in the United States opened in 1998
Amtrak Thruway Motorcoach stations in California